Krzemieniewo  is a village in Leszno County, Greater Poland Voivodeship, in west-central Poland. It is the seat of the gmina (administrative district) called Gmina Krzemieniewo.

The village has a population of 5,000.

References

Krzemieniewo